The Buhid language is a language spoken by Mangyans in the island of Mindoro, Philippines. It is divided into eastern and western dialects.

It uses the Buhid script, which is encoded in the Unicode-Block Buhid (Buid) (1740–175F).

Distribution
Barbian (1977) lists the following locations.
Malfalon, Calintaan, Occidental Mindoro
Barrio Rambida, Socorro, Oriental Mindoro
Bato Eli, Barrio Monte Claro, San José Pandurucan (on the southern bank of the Bugsanga (Bisanga) River)
Barrio Batangan, Panaytayan, Mansalay, Oriental Mindoro

References

Sources
Barham, R. Marie. 1958. The phonemes of the Buhid (Mangyan) language of Eastern Mindoro, Philippines. Studies in Philippine linguistics 4-9. 4-9.
Pennoyer, F. Douglas. 1980. "Buhid and Tawbuid: A new subgrouping Mindoro, Philippines." In Paz B. Naylor (ed.), Austronesian studies: Papers from the Second Eastern Conference on Austronesian languages, 265-271. Ann Arbor, University of Michigan: Center for South and Southeast Asian Studies.

External links
 Mangyan Heritage Center

Southern Mindoro languages
Mindoro